The Itatiaia Building (Portuguese: Edifício Itatiaia) is an apartment building in the Centro district of Campinas, São Paulo, Brazil. It was designed by the architect Oscar Niemeyer (1907-2012) in 1953 and completed in 1957. It was the only residential tower in Campinas until the early 1960s, and was the first Modernist building in the city.

It occupies  on a trapezoid-shaped plot of land on Irmã Serafina Avenue. It is often compared to another of building of the period, the Copan Building (Edifício Copan) in São Paulo.

References

Residential skyscrapers in Brazil
Modernist architecture in Brazil
Oscar Niemeyer buildings
Residential buildings completed in 1957